Vivo Minas (formerly known as Telemig Celular) was a regional Brazilian telecommunications company headquartered in Belo Horizonte. The company used to be one of eight wireless telephone companies that emerged from the break-up of Brazil's government-owned telephone monopoly Telebras. The name Telemig comes from the fact that it was the wireless company for the state of Minas Gerais. 

A group led by Canada's Telesystem International Wireless, together with Brazilian bank Opportunity and six Brazilian pension funds, paid 756 million reais for Telemig Celular when it was sold by the Brazilian government in June 1998.

The company operates AMPS and IS-136 networks on the 800/850 MHz band and a GSM network on the 1800 MHz (DCS) band in its licensed coverage area, the state of Minas Gerais. It started a 3G (HSDPA) deployment on 850 MHz in Belo Horizonte and has acquired 2100 MHz spectrum in its coverage area to offer statewide 3G services by the end of 2008.

External links
 Company investor relations page in English

Defunct companies of Brazil
Telecommunications companies of Brazil